Flávio da Silva Amado (born 30 December 1979), better known as Flávio, is an Angolan former professional footballer who played as striker. He is the assistant of Angolan side Petro Atlético.

Club career
Flávio helped his team Al Ahly to participate in the FIFA Club World Championship two successive times in 2005 and 2006.

In the FIFA Club World Championship 2006 opening match against Auckland City FC of New Zealand on 10 December 2006, he scored the first goal, helping Al-Ahly to a 2–0 win. In the semi-final on 13 December 2006, Al Ahly faced South American champions Internacional, and Flávio played and scored an equaliser with a header in the second half but Al-Ahly eventually lost the match 1–2.

After having a very unsuccessful first season with the team during which he scored only one goal in the league, and being jeered by fans at many times, most notably when he missed a penalty kick against rivals El Zamalek in the African Champions League, Flávio had a very successful second season in 2006–2007, seeing him top the goalscorers chart of the Egyptian Premier League with 17 goals, a single goal ahead of international Egyptian teammate Emad Moteab. He proved to be instrumental in Al Ahly's formation in the next years, scoring many vital goals in critical moments. Generally Flávio kept an extremely low profile and rarely appears in the media or give any press statements. Such attitude is highly appreciated by his club administration, since it agrees with the club's policies.

In his last season with Al Ahly (2008–2009), Flávio managed to score Al Ahly's only goal during the Egyptian Premier League play-off against Ismaily, handing the title to Al Ahly for the fifth time in row and rewarding himself with the second personal title of the Egyptian Premier League Top Goalscorer, for the third time as a foreign player in the Egyptian Premier League history after John Utaka with Ismaily during the 2000–2001 season, then Flávio himself formerly during the 2006–2007 season.

At his time with Al Ahly he was very known in Egypt for his heading accuracy and it was known that Al Ahly played a tactic that Flávio's fellow Angola national football team and Al Ahly teammate Gilberto would play a long ball to him from the sides, and Flávio would score with his head. He did this on multiple occasions, earning Al Ahly multiple titles domestically and continentally.

International career
Flávio was a member of the Angola national team, and was called up to the 2006 FIFA World Cup, in which he scored Angola's only goal of the tournament, with a header against Iran to clinch a 1–1 draw.

He scored three goals for Angola in African Cup of Nations Egypt 2006, although they went out from the second round. His goals were against Cameroon and Togo.

Career statistics

International

Scores and results list Angola's goal tally first, score column indicates score after each Flávio goal.

Honours
Al Ahly
 Egyptian Premier League: 2005–06, 2006–07, 2007–08, 2008–09
 Egypt Cup: 2006, 2007
 Egyptian Super Cup 2005, 2006, 2007, 2008
 CAF Champions League: 2005, 2006, 2008
 CAF Super Cup: 2006, 2007, 2009

Petro Atletico
 Girabola: 2000, 2001
 Taça de Angola: 2000, 2002, 2013
 Angolan SuperCup: 2002

Angola
 Qualified for the 2006 World Cup with Angola for the first time ever, and scored Angola's only World Cup goal in their history so far (despite playing for only thirty-nine minutes during the whole tournament).
 He scored 7 goals so far for Angola in African Cup of Nations so far, in Egypt 2006, Ghana 2008, Angola 2010.

Individual
 CAF Champions League best player: 2001
 Egyptian Premier League top goalscorer: 2006–07, 2008–09
 Girabola top goalscorer: 2001, 2002
 CAF Champions League top goalscorer: 2001

References

External links
 

1979 births
Living people
Footballers from Luanda
Angolan footballers
Angola international footballers
Angolan expatriate footballers
2006 FIFA World Cup players
2006 Africa Cup of Nations players
2008 Africa Cup of Nations players
2010 Africa Cup of Nations players
2012 Africa Cup of Nations players
Association football forwards
Al Ahly SC players
Al-Shabab FC (Riyadh) players
Atlético Petróleos de Luanda players
Lierse S.K. players
Belgian Pro League players
Egyptian Premier League players
Expatriate footballers in Egypt
Expatriate footballers in Saudi Arabia
Expatriate footballers in Qatar
Expatriate footballers in Belgium